Rosa hemisphaerica, also known as the sulphur rose, is a rose species with pale yellow flowers native to western Asia. The wild form, known as Rosa raphinii, has single flowers with five petals. A double-flowered form was one of the first yellow roses introduced to European gardens; John Bellenden Ker Gawler stated in 1815 that the species had been cultivated in England for nearly 200 years. The scent of the flowers has been described as unpleasant.

Etymology
The name Rosa hemisphaerica refers to the half-rounded fruit and ovaries, Latin "pomo hemisphaerico ... Germen hemisphaericum".

Description
The hips are orange. It blooms only in the spring.

See also

 List of Rosa species

References

hemisphaerica
Flora of Western Asia
Taxa named by Johann Hermann
Plants described in 1762